This is a list of flags used in Kazakhstan.

National flag

Presidential flag

Military flags

Naval flags

Rank flag

Non-Military Security Forces Flag

Scouts

Administrative divisions
Cities with special status

Regions

Districts

Cities/Towns

Historical flags

Proposed flags

Political flags

See also
Flag of Kazakhstan
Emblem of Kazakhstan

Lists and galleries of flags
Flags
List